The women's 1500 metres in speed skating at the 1988 Winter Olympics took place on February 27, at the Olympic Oval.

Records
Prior to this competition, the existing world and Olympic records were as follows:

The following new World and Olympic records were set during the competition.

Results

Constanze Moser-Scandolo was about to start for the East German team when she had to pull out due to injury; she won the World Allround Speed Skating Championships for Women in the following year.

The following are the results of the competitors:

References

Women's speed skating at the 1988 Winter Olympics
Olymp
Skat